The Dark Hour is a 1936 American film directed by Charles Lamont.

Plot
When Elsa Carson's (Irene Ware) Uncle, Henry Carson (William V. Mong), is found murdered there is no shortage of suspects.  To start with these include her other Uncle, Charles Carson (Hobart Bosworth), her fiancé, Jim Landis (Ray Walker), who is investigating the case; her Aunt, Mrs. Tallman (Hedda Hopper); and Foot, the Butler (E.E. Clive).

Elsa also doesn't know that retired Police Detective, Paul Bernard (Berton Churchill), has been on the trail of her Uncle Charles and the Butler for years, or that others might have their own motives for the murder.

Things then start to look bleak for Elsa when the murder weapon and a disguise are found in her room.

Differences from novel
Ewart Adamson based the screenplay on the 1928 novel The Last Trap, by American mystery writer Sinclair Gluck. The working title for the film was "The Last Trap".

The film omits many details from the novel. As Retired Police Detective Paul Bernard (Berton Churchill), admits to his young protégé, Jim Landis (Ray Walker), he only moved to the neighbourhood to gather evidence against Elsa's (Irene Ware) Uncle Charles Carson (Hobart Bosworth); and finally caught him in “The Last Trap” after a year.

Cast
Ray Walker as Jim Landis
Berton Churchill as Paul Bernard
Irene Ware as Elsa Carson
Hobart Bosworth as Charles Carson
Hedda Hopper as Mrs. Tallman
E. E. Clive as Foot, the Butler
Harold Goodwin as Peter Blake
William V. Mong as Henry Carson
Michael Mark as Arthur Bell
John St. Polis as Dr. Munro
Miki Morita as Choong
Aggie Herring as Mrs. Dubbin

References

External links

1936 films
1936 mystery films
American black-and-white films
Films directed by Charles Lamont
American mystery films
Chesterfield Pictures films
1930s English-language films
1930s American films